List of state trees may refer to:

List of Brazilian state trees, for the Brazilian states
List of Indian state trees, for the Indian states
List of state trees of Venezuela, for the Venezuelan states
List of U.S. state and territory trees, for the U.S. states.